The prime-factor algorithm (PFA), also called the Good–Thomas algorithm (1958/1963), is a fast Fourier transform (FFT) algorithm that re-expresses the discrete Fourier transform (DFT) of a size N = N1N2 as a two-dimensional N1×N2 DFT, but only for the case where N1 and N2 are relatively prime. These smaller transforms of size N1 and N2 can then be evaluated by applying PFA recursively or by using some other FFT algorithm.

PFA should not be confused with the mixed-radix generalization of the popular Cooley–Tukey algorithm, which also subdivides a DFT of size N = N1N2 into smaller transforms of size N1 and N2. The latter algorithm can use any factors (not necessarily relatively prime), but it has the disadvantage that it also requires extra multiplications by roots of unity called twiddle factors, in addition to the smaller transforms. On the other hand, PFA has the disadvantages that it only works for relatively prime factors (e.g. it is useless for power-of-two sizes) and that it requires more complicated re-indexing of the data based on the additive group isomorphisms. Note, however, that PFA can be combined with mixed-radix Cooley–Tukey, with the former factorizing N into relatively prime components and the latter handling repeated factors.

PFA is also closely related to the nested Winograd FFT algorithm, where the latter performs the decomposed N1 by N2 transform via more sophisticated two-dimensional convolution techniques. Some older papers therefore also call Winograd's algorithm a PFA FFT.

(Although the PFA is distinct from the Cooley–Tukey algorithm, Good's 1958 work on the PFA was cited as inspiration by Cooley and Tukey in their 1965 paper, and there was initially some confusion about whether the two algorithms were different. In fact, it was the only prior FFT work cited by them, as they were not then aware of the earlier research by Gauss and others.)

Algorithm
Let  a polynomial and  a principal th root of unity.
In other words,
 for all .

Mapping Based on CRT 

Choosing  (therefore), we rewrite  as follows:
.
we have 
.
Therefore, we have the multi-dimensional DFT, .

As Algebra Isomorphisms 
PFA can be stated in a high-level way in terms of algebra isomorphisms.
we have the following algebra isomorphism
 where  refers to the tensor product of algebras.
To see how PFA works,
we choose  and  be additive groups.
Choosing  as the group isomorphism , we have the algebra isomorphism , or alternatively,
.

Counting the Number of Multi-Dimensional Transformations 
Any additive group isomorphism will work.
To count the number of ways transforming  into ,
Therefore, there are exactly  many such maps where  is the Euler's totient function.
The smallest example is  where , demonstrating the two maps in the literature: the "CRT mapping" and the "Ruritanian mapping".

See also
 Bluestein's FFT algorithm
 Rader's FFT algorithm

References

 Addendum, ibid. 22 (2), 373-375 (1960) .

FFT algorithms